The Kentish Knock is a long shoal (bank, shallows) in the North Sea east of Essex, England. Thus it is a major hazard to deep-draught navigation. It is exactly  due east of Foulness Point, Essex and is centred about  NNE of North Foreland, Kentboth are extreme points of those counties.

Shape
It is about equidistant between, on the one hand, the south-west North Sea tidal amphidromic point (place of negligible tides); and splayed on the other the narrowest point and endpoint of the English Channel (the Strait of Dover) (southeast) and heart of the Tideway (southwest) which have by contrast high tidal range.  It is thus among a succession of banks which are aligned NNE to SSW but turn towards the estuary narrowing further west. In line with the erosion and deposition from each such regular tide, its northits steepest, narrowest part veers slightly more towards north-south alignment than its south.

Ecology 
Made of sand and gravel, it hosts hermit crabs, sand goby, rays and catsharks. In rare species it has visiting red-throated divers. Channels are believed to have been caused by glacial floodwaters many millennia ago. Since 2012, The Wildlife Trusts have been campaigning for recognition of a 96 km2 section of the Knock, known as Kentish Knock East, as a Marine Conservation Zone.

Scope and soundings

To explain the numbers on the inset map a depth of 11 is a formula of six feet (i.e. one fathom) and 1 foot. It is  fathoms. Some of Kentish Knock is, or was, at normal low tide "01".  At just one foot in depth it will have become exposed at the ebb phase of most extreme, spring tides.

Maritime history

See also 
 Carnarvon Basin, Australia, where Kentish Knock South-1 is an exploratory oil well in the Mungaroo Sands.
 Dogger Bank, a many-times bigger bank that extends further east, about 150 miles north

References 

Landforms of England
Sandbanks of the North Sea
Shoals of the United Kingdom
Thames Estuary
Aviation accidents and incidents locations in England